Matthew Sention, may refer to:

Matthias Sention, Sr., (1601–1669) founding settler of Massachusetts and Connecticut
Matthias Sention, Jr., (1628–1728) was a founding settler of Norwalk, Connecticut